Repentance is the title of the fifty-fourth studio album by Jamaican musician and record producer  Lee "Scratch" Perry. It was released on August 19, 2008. The album is released by Narnack Records.

Repentance is co-produced by Andrew W.K., and features guest appearances from Aimee Allen, Moby, Don Fleming, Brian Chippendale, Josh Werner, Ari Up, and Sasha Grey.

Track listing
 "Shine" 
 "Fire" 
 "Pum-Pum" 
 "Reggae Man" 
 "Baby Sucker" 
 "Crazy Pimp" 
 "War Dance" 
 "God Save His King" 
 "Santa Claus" 
 "Heart Doctor" 
 "Chooga Cane" 
 "Party Time"

2008 albums
Lee "Scratch" Perry albums
Albums produced by Lee "Scratch" Perry